Second Church of Christ, Scientist is a historic former Christian Science church building located at 948 West Adams Boulevard, in the West Adams district of Los Angeles, California. It is now the Art of Living Center Los Angeles.

History
Designed by noted Los Angeles architect Alfred H. Rosenheim in the Classical Revival style of architecture, it was built in 1910.

On July 17, 1968, the City of Los Angeles designated the building a Los Angeles Historic-Cultural Monument.

The church was used as the courthouse in the crime drama Matlock and as a location for other film and TV projects.

The Art of Living Foundation
In late 2009, the Church property was sold to the non-profit Art of Living Foundation. It was restored and is used as a community center, speaking and music venue, and is a center for the Foundation's service work and breathing, meditation, and other programs. While the Art of Living Foundation has been active in Southern California since the late 1980s, it officially opened in this location on April 14, 2010.

National register listing

Second Church of Christ, Scientist (added 1987 - Building - #87000576)
946 W. Adams Blvd., Los Angeles
Historic Significance: 	Event, Architecture/Engineering
Architect, builder, or engineer: Albert C. Martin, Sr., Alfred Rosenheim
Architectural Style: 	Classical Revival
Area of Significance: 	Architecture, Religion
Period of Significance: 	1900-1924
Owner: 	Private
Historic Function: 	Religion
Historic Sub-function: 	Religious Structure
Current Function: 	Non-profit educational and humanitarian
Current Sub-function: 	Community service, personal development, trauma relief—501(c)(3)

See also
 First Church of Christ, Scientist (Los Angeles, California)
 List of Los Angeles Historic-Cultural Monuments in South Los Angeles
List of Registered Historic Places in Los Angeles
 Second Church of Christ, Scientist (disambiguation)

References

External links
National Register listing
 City of Los Angeles listing with picture
 Big Orange Landmarks listing with many pictures
Realtor's listing

Churches in Los Angeles
West Adams, Los Angeles
Former Christian Science churches, societies and buildings in California
Churches completed in 1907
Los Angeles Historic-Cultural Monuments
Properties of religious function on the National Register of Historic Places in Los Angeles
Greek Revival church buildings in California
Neoclassical architecture in California
Neoclassical church buildings in the United States